Point Lookout is an unincorporated community in Oliver Township, Taney County, Missouri, United States, near Branson and Hollister. Point Lookout is in U.S. post office ZIP code 65726. Point Lookout is part of the Branson Micropolitan Statistical Area.

History
The Point Lookout post office has been in operation since 1931. The community was so named because of its lofty elevation. Its elevation is approximately 928.96 feet or 283.15 meters above mean sea level.

Education
College of the Ozarks completely encompasses the community. The entire 1,000 acres of Point Lookout is owned and maintained by the College of the Ozarks. College of the Ozarks previously hosted the NAIA Division II basketball tournament annually.

References

Unincorporated communities in Taney County, Missouri
Branson, Missouri micropolitan area
Unincorporated communities in Missouri